Emil Schreyer (died 6 August 1916) was a Swiss footballer who played for FC Basel. He played mainly in the position of forward, but also as a midfielder. 

Between the years 1912 and 1915 Schreyer played 42 games for Basel scoring 11 goals; 28 of these games were in the Swiss Serie A, two in the Anglo-Cup and 12 were friendly games. He scored 11 goal in the domestic league and three in the Anglo-Cup, the other three were scored during the test games.

In the 1912–13 season Basel won the Anglo-Cup. In the round of 16 on 8 June 1913 Schreyer scored a hattrick as Basel beat St. Gallen 4–1 to continue to the next round. He was part of the team that won the final on 29 June 1913 in the Hardau Stadium, Zürich against FC Weissenbühl Bern 5–0.

Sources and References
 Rotblau: Jahrbuch Saison 2017/2018. Publisher: FC Basel Marketing AG. 

FC Basel players
Swiss men's footballers
Association football midfielders
Association football forwards
1916 deaths